Mollinedia butleriana is a species of plant in the Monimiaceae family. It is endemic to Honduras.

References

but
Endemic flora of Honduras
Critically endangered flora of North America
Taxonomy articles created by Polbot